Eagle Ironworks (or Eagle Iron Works) is a name used by a number of companies producing ironwork products.

It may refer to:
 Lucy's Eagle Ironworks, Oxford, England

See also
 Eagleworks (disambiguation)
 Eagle (disambiguation)